The giant sable antelope or royal sable antelope (Hippotragus niger variani), also known in Portuguese as the palanca-negra-gigante, is a large, rare subspecies of the sable antelope native and endemic to the region between the Cuango and Luando Rivers in Angola.

There was a great degree of uncertainty regarding the number of animals that survived during the Angolan Civil War.  In January 2004, a group from the Centro de Estudos e Investigação Científica of the Catholic University of Angola, led by Dr. Pedro Vaz Pinto, was able to obtain photographic evidence of one of the remaining herds from a series of trap cameras installed in the Cangandala National Park, south of Malanje.

The giant sable antelope is the national symbol of Angola, and is held in a great regard by its people.  This was perhaps one of the reasons the animals survived the long civil war.  In African mythology, just like other antelopes, they symbolize vivacity, velocity, beauty and visual sharpness.

The giant sable antelope is evaluated as critically endangered on the IUCN Red List of Threatened Species. As of 2021 they reportedly only have a population of 300, 100 of which are living in Cangandala National Park.

Description 

Both sexes have horns, which can reach 1.5 meters in length. Males and females are very similar in appearance until they reach three years of age, when the males become darker and develop majestic horns. Females weigh 220 kg and are slightly shorter than males. Coloration in bulls is black, while cows and calves are chestnut, except in southern populations where females turn brownish-black. Most sable antelopes have white "eyebrows", their rostra are sectioned into cheek stripes, and their bellies and rump patches are white. Young under two months old typically are light brown and have slight markings.

The largest giant sable antelope horns recorded to date measured 65 inches long. The animal was shot by the Count of Yebes in Angola in 1949 and became the world record.

Ecology and behavior
Like all antelopes, giant sables are shy by nature, but they can also be very aggressive. The males can be especially dangerous when hurt, attacked, or approached. In fights, males avoid some serious injuries by kneeling down on their front legs, and engage in horn-wrestling fights. Fatalities from these fights are rare.

Juveniles are hunted by leopards and hyenas, while adults are only threatened by lions and crocodiles. When startled, the antelope normally runs for only a short distance before slowing and looking back; however, when they are pursued, they can run at speeds up to 35 mph for a considerable distance.

Evolution 
Mitochondrial DNA evidence from a specimen preserved in the Museu da Ciência da Universidade de Coimbra before the Angolan Civil War suggest that the giant sable is monophyletic within the sable antelope group, and that it split from the other three sable antelope subspecies around 170,000 years ago.

Habitat 
The giant sable antelope lives in forests near water, where leaves and tree sprouts are always juicy and abundant. It is a critically endangered subspecies; it is protected in natural parks and hunting it is forbidden. Typically, giant sable antelopes are specialized browsers feeding on foliage and herbs, especially those growing on termite mounds. One of the reasons for the decline in giant sable antelope numbers could be the animals' very specific feeding patterns.

Relationship with humans 
The giant sable antelope is a national symbol of Angola and is portrayed on numerous stamps, banknotes, and even passports of the nation. The Angola national football team is fondly known as the Palancas Negras in honor of this antelope.

References 

 Walker, John Frederick. A Certain Curve of Horn: The Hundred-Year Quest for the Giant Sable Antelope of Angola. Atlantic Monthly Press. 2002.
 Cabral, C. & Verissimo, L. (2005) - The Ungulate Fauna of Angola: Systematic List, Distribution Maps, Database Report. Instituto de Investigação Científica Tropical, Estudos Ensaios e Documentos, 163, Lisboa
 Mellon, James African Hunter Safari Bress (185)

Bibliography

External links 
 ANGOLA: Rare sable antelope survives the war
 Kissama National Park: The Giant Sable of Angola
 BBC News: Search on for Giant Antelope
 Angola Press: Government Partners Sign Memorandum on Sable Antelope Protection
 Dr. Pedro Vaz Pinto's blog on attempts to revive the giant sable herd in Angola's Cangandala National Park

sable antelope, giant
Mammals of Angola
Endemic fauna of Angola
giant sable antelope
giant sable antelope